Jiří Teplý (born December 2, 1962, in Nove Mesto na Morave) was a Czechoslovakian-Czech cross-country skier who competed from 1991 to 1995. Competing in two Winter Olympics, he earned his best career and individual finishes of eighth in the 4 × 10 km relay and 17th in the 30 km event, respectively, both at Lillehammer in 1994.

Teplý's best finish at the FIS Nordic World Ski Championships was 13th in the 50 km event at Val di Fiemme in 1991. His best World Cup finish was 11th in a 10 km event in Austria in 1992.

Teplý earned two individual career FIS Race wins (1993, 1994).

External links

Olympic 4 × 10 km relay results: 1936–2002 

1962 births
Cross-country skiers at the 1992 Winter Olympics
Cross-country skiers at the 1994 Winter Olympics
Czech male cross-country skiers
Czechoslovak skiers
Living people
Olympic cross-country skiers of Czechoslovakia
Olympic cross-country skiers of the Czech Republic